Paulo Emilio Silva Azevedo (born December 14, 1969 in Salvador) is a male beach volleyball player from Brazil. He won the silver medal in the men's beach team competition at the 2003 Pan American Games in Santo Domingo, Dominican Republic, partnering Luizão Correa.

References

External links 
 

1969 births
Living people
Brazilian men's beach volleyball players
Beach volleyball players at the 2003 Pan American Games
Pan American Games silver medalists for Brazil
Pan American Games medalists in volleyball
Medalists at the 2003 Pan American Games
Sportspeople from Salvador, Bahia
21st-century Brazilian people